Puerto Rican racer is a common name which may refer to two species of snake native to Puerto Rico:

Borikenophis portoricensis, long recognized as a distinct species
Borikenophis prymnus, recently recognized as a distinct species from B. portoricensis
Borikenophis variegatus, recently recognized as a distinct species from B. portoricensis